William Henry Mansell Heath (born 15 April 1934) is an English former footballer who made 118 appearances in the Football League playing as a goalkeeper for Bournemouth & Boscombe Athletic and Lincoln City. He moved into non-league football with Cambridge City, with whom he won the Southern League title in 1962–63, and later became player-manager of Newmarket Town.

References

1934 births
Living people
Footballers from Bournemouth
English footballers
Association football goalkeepers
AFC Bournemouth players
Lincoln City F.C. players
Cambridge City F.C. players
English Football League players
Southern Football League players
English football managers
Newmarket Town F.C. players